The Marked Heart is a Colombian thriller drama streaming television series created by Venezuelan screenwriter  and produced by CMO Producciones. The series premiered worldwide on Netflix on April 20, 2022. After its premiere, the series was renewed for a second season.

Plot 
Valeria, Simón's wife, is murdered by a crime syndicate in order to remove her intact and compatible heart and transplant it into another person. This person is Camila, the wife of a wealthy man, who remains unclear about the true origin of her new heart. Simón, desperate and driven by revenge, enters the dangerous world of organ trafficking. Camila, too, increasingly searches for answers and questions everything. Meanwhile, Simón dives further and further down the abyss to find those responsible for his wife's death and make them pay. During his journey, Simón falls in love with Camila, who is allowed to live on thanks to the stolen heart of his murdered wife. When they both find out the truth, things become drastically more complicated and everything takes an even more life-threatening turn.

Cast 
 Michel Brown as Simón Duque
 Ana Lucía Domínguez as Camila Duarte
 Sebastián Martínez as Zacarías Cienfuegos
 Margarita Muñoz as Valeria Duque
 Moisés Arizmendi as Mariachi
 Valeria Emiliani as Samantha Duque
 Julián Cerati as Tomás
 Juan Fernando Sánchez as Juan Carlos Sarmiento
 Mauricio Cujar as Braulio Cárdenas
 Jacqueline Arenal as Greta Volcán

Episodes

References

External links
 
 

Thriller television series
Television shows filmed in Colombia
2020s Colombian television series
2022 Colombian television series debuts
Spanish-language Netflix original programming
Television series about revenge